Walter C. Dunton (November 29, 1830 – April 23, 1890) was a Vermont attorney, businessman, politician, and judge.  In addition to serving in the Vermont State Senate, Dunton was a justice of the Vermont Supreme Court from 1877 to 1879.

Early life
Walter Chipman Dunton was born in Bristol, Vermont on November 29, 1830.  He was educated at Franklin Academy, and graduated from Middlebury College in 1857.  After graduation, Dunton studied law with the firm of Dillingham and Durant of Waterbury, and then with Linsley and Prout of Rutland.  He was admitted to the bar in 1858, moved to Manhattan, Kansas Territory, and established a practice in Riley County, Kansas.  A Republican, Dunton served in the Territorial Legislature in 1861.

Military career
In 1862, Dunton enlisted for the American Civil War, was commissioned as a captain in the Union Army, and was appointed commander of Company F, 14th Vermont Infantry.  Part of the 2nd Vermont Brigade, the 14th Vermont was a 10-month regiment, and was active from October 1862 to August 1863; it took part in the defense of Washington, DC, and played a key role in breaking up Pickett's Charge during the Battle of Gettysburg.

After the war, Vermont Grand Army of the Republic Post 110 in Bristol was named in his honor.

Later career
After leaving the Army, Dunton practiced law in Rutland as the partner of John Prout and Wheelock G. Veazey.  In 1865 he was elected probate judge of Rutland County, and he served until 1877.  In 1870 he was a delegate to the state constitutional convention.  Dunton served as a trustee of Middlebury College from 1870 to 1890.

In April 1877, Dunton was appointed a justice of the Vermont Supreme Court, replacing Hoyt H. Wheeler, who resigned to become Judge of the United States District Court for the District of Vermont.  He served until 1879, when he resigned and returned to practicing law; he was succeeded on the court by his law partner Wheelock Veazey.

Dunton served in the Vermont State Senate from 1880 to 1882, and served as chairman of the Judiciary Committee. He served as president of the Vermont Bar Association from 1880 to 1881, and from 1888 to 1889 he was a law professor at Iowa State University. Dunton was also active in several businesses; in addition to serving as the attorney for Rutland's Baxter National Bank, he was also a member of the bank's board of directors.

Death and burial
Dunton died in Rutland on April 23, 1890, and was buried at Evergreen Cemetery in Rutland.

Family
In October 1862, Dunton married Miriam E. Barrett of Rutland.  They were the parents of one son and four daughters: Agnes Ellen; Edith Kellogg; Walter Barrett; Miriam Buttrick; and Mary.

References

Sources

Books

Newspapers

Internet

External links

1830 births
1890 deaths
Middlebury College alumni
Vermont lawyers
Kansas lawyers
Members of the Kansas Territorial Legislature
Vermont state court judges
Justices of the Vermont Supreme Court
Vermont state senators
People of Vermont in the American Civil War
Burials at Evergreen Cemetery (Rutland, Vermont)
19th-century American politicians
19th-century American judges
19th-century American lawyers